Faith movement may refer to:
 Word of Faith, a worldwide Christian movement
 Faith Movement Arakan, an insurgent group active in Rakhine State, Myanmar (Burma)